General elections were held in Denmark on 14 May 1957. The Social Democratic Party remained the largest in the Folketing, with 70 of the 179 seats. Voter turnout was 84% in Denmark proper, 38% in the Faroe Islands and 62% in Greenland (although only one of its two constituencies was contested as the incumbent in the other was re-elected unopposed). The electoral threshold was 60,000 votes.

Results

References

Elections in Denmark
Denmark
1957 elections in Denmark
May 1957 events in Europe